Crawford Township is one of the twenty-two townships of Coshocton County, Ohio, United States. As of the 2010 census the population was 1,858.

Geography
Located in the northeastern corner of the county, it borders the following townships:
Clark Township, Holmes County - north
Bucks Township, Tuscarawas County - east
Adams Township - southeast corner
White Eyes Township - south
Keene Township - southwest corner
Mill Creek Township - west
Mechanic Township, Holmes County - northwest corner

Part of the village of Baltic is located in the northeastern corner of Crawford Township. Crawford Township contains the unincorporated community of Chili.

Name and history
Crawford Township was organized in 1828. It was likely named for Associate Judge Crawford, a landowner.

Statewide, the only other Crawford Township is located in Wyandot County.

Government
The township is governed by a three-member board of trustees, who are elected in November of odd-numbered years to a four-year term beginning on the following January 1. Two are elected in the year after the presidential election and one is elected in the year before it. There is also an elected township fiscal officer, who serves a four-year term beginning on April 1 of the year after the election, which is held in November of the year before the presidential election. Vacancies in the fiscal officership or on the board of trustees are filled by the remaining trustees.

References

External links
County website

Townships in Coshocton County, Ohio
Townships in Ohio